Pravin H Parekh is a senior counsel practising at Supreme Court of India. He has served at six times as the president of the Supreme Court Bar Association of India.  In 2012, Parekh was conferred with Padma Shri, the fourth highest Indian civilian honour.

References

Supreme Court of India
Living people
Indian Senior Counsel
Recipients of the Padma Shri in public affairs
Year of birth missing (living people)